Patricia Tarabini (born 6 August 1968) is an Argentine tennis coach and former player. She represented her country and won the bronze medal at the 2004 Athens Olympic games, with Paola Suárez, where they lost 7–9 in the third set to eventual gold medalists from China, Sun Tiantian and Li Ting. On 9 May 1988, Tarabini reached her highest singles ranking of world No. 29. Her career-high doubles ranking is No. 12, which she achieved on 17 August 1998. Patricia turned pro in 1986, and won a total of 15 top-level doubles titles in her career. She is the 1996 French Open mixed-doubles champion, partnering with Javier Frana.

In June 2019, she began coaching Russian player Anna Kalinskaya, then ranked just within the WTA's top 150.

Major finals

Olympic finals

Doubles: 1 (1 bronze medal)

Mixed doubles: 1 (1 title)

WTA career finals

Singles: 3 (3 runner-ups)

Doubles: 31 (15 titles, 16 runner-ups)

ITF Circuit finals

Singles: 3 (2–1)

Doubles: 11 (6–5)

Career statistics

Singles performance timeline

External links
 
 
 

1968 births
Living people
Argentine female tennis players
Argentine tennis coaches
Argentine people of Italian descent
Olympic bronze medalists for Argentina
Olympic medalists in tennis
Olympic tennis players of Argentina
People from Tandil
Sportspeople from La Plata
Tennis players at the 1992 Summer Olympics
Tennis players at the 1995 Pan American Games
Tennis players at the 1996 Summer Olympics
Tennis players at the 2004 Summer Olympics
Grand Slam (tennis) champions in mixed doubles
Grand Slam (tennis) champions in girls' singles
Grand Slam (tennis) champions in girls' doubles
Medalists at the 2004 Summer Olympics
Pan American Games gold medalists for Argentina
Pan American Games medalists in tennis
Pan American Games silver medalists for Argentina
French Open junior champions
French Open champions
Medalists at the 1995 Pan American Games